"Freiflug" (German for "Free Flight") is the fourth single by German metal band Megaherz, and the third and final single from their album Kopfschuss. The single hit the German alternative charts at #7.

Track listing 
 "Freiflug (Video / Radio Cut)"
 "Freiflug (Album Version)"
 Multimedia-track (CD extra track with video, biography, band photos, etc.)

Video 
The video for "Freiflug" shows Alexx Wesselsky, the vocalist for the band, tied up in a rope and hung over a fire (as shown in the cover for the single). Rats feature prominently in the video, and the clown from the cover of Kopfschuss is also shown. At the end of the video, rats chew through the ropes supporting him and he falls, presumably to his death.

The video is available for free download and streaming on the official Megaherz site.

1999 singles
Megaherz songs
1998 songs
ZYX Music singles
Songs written by Noel Pix
Songs written by Alexander Wesselsky